The sixth series of the Ojarumaru anime series aired from April 7 to December 8, 2003 on NHK for a total of 90 episodes.

The series' opening theme is "Utahito" (詠人) by Saburō Kitajima. The ending theme is "Kono Machi Itsumo ~Bin-chan no Uta~" (この町いつも〜貧ちゃんの歌〜 Always in this Town ~Poverty-chan's Song~) by Ayaka Saitō.

The series was released on VHS and DVD by NHK Enterprises across two compilation volumes, each containing 8 selected episodes. The DVDs were released simultaneously on July 23, 2004, while the tapes were released simultaneously on August 27, 2004. The first volume contains episodes 465, 478, 481, 504, 507, 508, 527, and 533. The second volume contains episodes 467, 473, 486, 495, 514, 522, 529, and 537.

Episodes

References

External links
 Series 6 episode list

Ojarumaru episode lists